Højgaard is a Danish language surname, which means "high farm" or "high garden", derived from the Danish words høj ("high") and gaard or gård (meaning "garden" or "farm"). The name may refer to:

Else Højgaard (1906–1979), Danish ballerina and actress
Hans Jacob Højgaard (1904–1992), Faroese composer
Kári P. Højgaard (born 1951), Faroese politician
Knud Højgaard (1878–1968), Danish businessman
Nicolai Højgaard (born 2001), Danish golfer
Rasmus Højgaard (born 2001), Danish golfer

References

Danish-language surnames